The Western Washington University Women's Rowing team has currently won the NCAA Division II National Championships for the last 5 years, for the 2005 through 2009 seasons. Their fifth win was accomplished on June 1 in Sacramento, CA on Lake Natoma. They are the first NCAA rowing team to win 5 consecutive titles, since the NCAA began recognizing women's rowing in 1997.

History

The Vikings have been a team since 1978, but were not granted varsity status at Western until 1982. The current coach, John Fuchs has coached since the 1999 season.

Notes and references

Rowing, women's
Women's sports in Washington (state)